Jack Francis Lee Laver (9 March 1917 – 3 October 2017) was a Tasmanian cricketer who played 13 matches of first class cricket for Tasmania between 1946 and 1952.

Laver was an off-spin bowler and lower-order batsman. He made his highest first-class score of 93 on his debut, playing against Victoria in 1946–47. His innings took only 94 minutes. Two weeks later he took his best bowling figures of 5 for 26 (off only 34 balls) against the touring MCC team, including the wickets of Denis Compton and Bill Edrich. He captained Tasmania against Victoria in the 1950–51 season, but Tasmania lost the match by nine wickets.

He served in World War II as a lieutenant in the 6th Australian Division Provost Company.

In March 2017 he became only the third Australian first-class cricketer, after Ted Martin and Harold Stapleton, to reach 100 years of age. He died on 3 October 2017; his wife Nancy predeceased him. Test cricketer Frank Laver was his uncle, and tennis star Rod Laver was a second cousin.

References

External links

1917 births
2017 deaths
Australian cricketers
Men centenarians
Tasmania cricketers
Cricketers from Melbourne
Australian centenarians
Australian military personnel of World War II
Military personnel from Melbourne
People from Malvern, Victoria